Aleksandar Aleksandrov (born 3 January 1972), nicknamed Wosz, is a former Bulgarian footballer who played as a midfielder.

References

External links
 

Living people
1972 births
Bulgarian footballers
Association football midfielders
FC Montana players
PFC CSKA Sofia players
OFC Sliven 2000 players
PFC Spartak Pleven players
PFC Dobrudzha Dobrich players
PFC Lokomotiv Plovdiv players
SR Delémont players
First Professional Football League (Bulgaria) players
Bulgarian football managers